The 2016 Maine Black Bears football team represented the University of Maine in the 2016 NCAA Division I FCS football season. They were led by first-year head coach Joe Harasymiak and played their home games at Alfond Stadium. They were a member of the Colonial Athletic Association. They finished the season 6–5, 5–3 in CAA play to finish in a tie for fourth place.

Schedule

 Source:

Game summaries

UConn

Toledo

James Madison

Bryant

Delaware

Albany

Rhode Island

William & Mary

Villanova

Stony Brook

New Hampshire

References

Maine
Maine Black Bears football seasons
Maine Black Bears football